Rita Wanki Awachwi  (born 6 January 1994) is a Cameroonian women's international footballer who plays as a defender. She is a member of the Cameroon women's national football team. She was part of the team at the 2015 FIFA Women's World Cup. On club level she plays for Locomotive Yaoundé in Cameroon.

References

1994 births
Living people
Women's association football defenders
Cameroonian women's footballers
Place of birth missing (living people)
Cameroon women's international footballers
2015 FIFA Women's World Cup players
African Games silver medalists for Cameroon
African Games medalists in football
Competitors at the 2015 African Games
21st-century Cameroonian women
20th-century Cameroonian women